Afermejan may refer to:
 Afermejan-e Olya
 Afermejan-e Sofla